Mick Poole (born 27 November 1966) is a former international speedway rider from Australia.

Speedway career 
Poole won a bronze medal at the Australian Championship in 2001 and won the Longtrack title the same year. He rode in the top tier of British Speedway from 1985–1994, riding for various clubs.

References 

Living people
1966 births
Australian speedway riders
King's Lynn Stars riders
Oxford Cheetahs riders
Peterborough Panthers riders
Poole Pirates riders
Motorcycle racers from Sydney